Best is a municipality and a village in the southern Netherlands. It is situated northwest of the city Eindhoven, and is also part of the agglomeration of this city.

The headquarters of Europe's largest meat processor Vion NV are located in Best, as are Philips Healthcare and the Bata Shoe Organization's "Bata Protective" operations (B2B).

History
The village used to be a part of Oirschot, a nearby town. But as Best was situated on the state road from Amsterdam to Maastricht, this often created difficulties. Each time the military wanted to quarter troops in Best, they had to request to be stationed in Oirschot, 10 km away, for this to be allowed. Because of this difficulty, the government decided to separate Best from Oirschot in 1819.

Archaeological excavations around the village suggest settlement in the area dating back to the Roman era. The Armenhoef is a monumental farm on the Oirschotseweg 117 in Best.
This stable is the oldest still in use within Western Europe. Historical building research in 2009 showed that the wooden frame of the stable dates back to 1263. The residential part of the farm itself was built in recent times, in 1640 at the earliest, but probably around 1680. The farm is an official monument.
The first written text about Best dates back to 1421.

The village itself, however, did not exist until the 19th century. There were three small villages: Naastenbest in the west, Wilhelminadorp in the south and Verrenbest where Oranjestraat is located. They grew together, and formed the village with the name Best.

Best received a train station on the line Rotterdam - Breda - Boxtel - Helmond - Venlo - Maastricht. The line had only one track, but traffic congestion necessitated another track, so it was made double-tracked. In the 1980s, congestion once again became a problem so two more tracks were added in 2002. It is now possible to travel to Best from Utrecht or Eindhoven by train.

The spoken language is North Meierijs (an East Brabantian dialect, which is very similar to colloquial Dutch).

Population centres

Events
 Lake Dance - at Aqua Best 25 June 2011
 Extrema Outdoor - at Aqua Best 16 July 2011
 Sneakerz Festival - at Aqua Best 18 September 2010

Politics

Transport
For train transport see Best railway station.

One can take a bus (line number 9) from the Eindhoven central station to Best. Or one can also take a bus (line numbers 141/142) from the Tilburg central station to Best.

Notable people 

 José Hoebee (born 1954 in Best) a Dutch pop singer and member of girl group Luv'
 Rob Kemps (born 1985 in Best) cabaret artist and artist of Snollebollekes
 Ralf Mackenbach (born 1995 in Best) a Dutch singer and dancer, winner of the Junior Eurovision Song Contest 2009
 Pepijn Senders (born 1992 in Best) accomplished software engineer

Sport 
 Eric Swinkels (born 1949 in Best) sports shooter and silver medallist at the 1976 Summer Olympics
 Peter Aerts (born 1970) a Dutch semi-retired super heavyweight kickboxer, trained in Best
 Jesse Mahieu (born 1978 in Best) field hockey defender and team silver medallist at the 2004 Summer Olympics
 Dennis Retera (born 1986 in Best) a Dutch racing driver
 Roel van de Sande (born 1987 in Best) a Dutch professional footballer with 250 club caps

Gallery

References

External links 
 

 
Municipalities of North Brabant
Populated places in North Brabant